Douglas R. Campbell (born August 27, 1945) is a judge currently serving on the Federal Court of Canada. Since January 2011, he has been a supernumerary judge.

References

1945 births
Living people
Judges of the Federal Court of Canada
People from Calgary